Volleyball was contested at the 2015 Summer Universiade from July 2 to 12 in Gwangju, South Korea.

Medal summary

Medal table

Medal events

Men

Twenty-one teams participated in the men's tournament.

Teams

Pool A

Pool B

Pool C

Pool D

Women

Sixteen teams participated in the women's tournament.

Teams

Pool A

Pool B

Pool C

Pool D

References

External links
Official Games site

2015 Summer Universiade events
Volleyball at the Summer Universiade